Raghvendra Singh (born 30 August 1966) is an Indian lyricist, writer and chief assistant director. He has penned lyrics in popular serials including Dadi Amma Dadi Amma Maan Jaao, Piyaa Albela, Ek Shringaar Swabhimaan, Mere Rang Mein Rangne Waali, Jhilmil Sitaaron Ka Aangan Hoga, and Suron Ka Kaarwan on ATN channel in 1997. He also penned lyrics in a feature film Jaydev starring Jeetendra.

Songs including "Jogiya", "Malanga", "O Kanha", "Rab ne kaisa khel rachaaya", "Teej aayi hariyaali" and "Tu pyar hai Tu hi Tabahi" got recognition. Well-known singers who rendered their voices to his lyrics include Udit Narayan, Sadhana Sargam, Vinod Rathod, Shaan, Mahalakshmi Iyer, Harshdeep Kaur, Palak Muchhal, Krishna Beaura, Richa Sharma, Pamela Jain Udbhav Ojha, Aditi Paul, and Aakanksha Sharma. 

He was one of the story writers of Vivah, and contributed as a chief assistant director in this feature film.

He was a creative writer in many TV series including Woh Rahne Waali Mahlon Ki, Main Teri Parchayin Hoon, Do Hanson Ka Jodaa, Yahan main ghar ghar kheli, Jhilmil Sitaaron Ka Aangan Hogaa, Mere rang mein rangne waali, Ek shringaar Swabhimaan and Piya Albela.

He started his career as an assistant director with director Sooraj R. Barjatya in Hum Saath Saath Hain.

Early and personal life 

Raghvedra Singh's native place Dhandhupura is situated 2 km from the Taj Mahal in Agra. He worked with his father Narendra Singh Verma in the documentary Visit India Discover Agra as a chief assistant director in 1985. His father passed out from Film And Television Institute, Pune in 1st batch of direction and screenplay writing in 1964. At that time, Shatrughn Sinha, Subhash Ghai, Firoz Chinoy, P. Kumar Vasudev were his father's batchmates in film institute.

Minister in Uttar-pradesh government  Chaudhary Udai Bhan Singh is his uncle . His great grand father Babu Pyare Lal fought first Member of Legislative Assambly election in Agra with Bhartiya Jan Sangh party in 1951. Babu Pyare Lal Ka Nagla one km away from Taj Mahal, this residential area name was kept in respect of his great grand father who was close friend of Yug Purush & former  Prime Minister Atal Bihari Vajpayee.

After graduation, he completed LL.B from Agra College, Agra in 1989.

To make his dreams true, he came to Mumbai in 1991, and joined Dalal Street Investment Journal, a share market magazine as a correspondent.

His first song was recorded at Film Centre for film Jaydev starring Jeetendra  in 1994 , but it was released in 2001.

Discography

Award functions
His song "Jogiya" and MalangaRe were performed in Zee Rishtey Awards Awards in 2017.

As a lyricist

Music Videos

Filmography/serials

As a story writer(Story Inputs) and Chief Assistant Director

As a creative writer

As a chief assistant director

As an assistant director

Awards and nominations

References

External links 
 https://m.youtube.com/watch?v=McJnrkGlIzg
https://www.newsnationtv.com/entertainment/bollywood/punjabi-song-kinna-kinna-sona-sona-sung-by-rani-indrani-sharma-written-by-raghvendra-singh-171795.html
 http://www.gr8mag.com/posts.php?id=1334#.UIMKLGmUIpQ.facebook
 https://www.imdb.com/title/tt2567820/
 http://indiantelevisionacademy.com/raghvendra-singh/
 http://www.rajshri.com/tv/piyaa-albela/
 http://www.rajshri.com/tv/ek-shringaar-swabhimaan/
 http://www.rajshri.com/tv/mere-rang-mein-rangne-waali/
 http://www.rajshri.com/tv/jhilmil-sitaaron-ka-aangan-hoga/
 http://www.jagran.com/uttar-pradesh/agra-city-rajashree-production-pride-of-raghvendra-18230538.html
 https://www.hotstar.com/in/tv/dadi-amma-maan-jaao/s-2477 on Hotstar
 https://www.voot.com/shows/ek-shringaar-swabhimaan/1/465453/challenging-societal-norms/465643
 https://www.zee5.com/tvshows/details/piyaa-albela/0-6-311/piyaa-albela-episode-1-march-6-2017-full-episode/0-1-83716
 http://www.rajshri.com/tv/jhilmil-sitaaron-ka-aangan-hoga/
 http://www.jagran.com/uttar-pradesh/agra-city-rajashree-production-pride-of-raghvendra-18230538.html
 https://m.patrika.com/jhalawar-news/bollywood-will-be-fascinated-by-the-beauty-of-mankundra-1-3190452//
 https://m.imdb.com/name/nm1876616/
 https://www.cinestaan.com/movies/jaydev-15368
 https://m.imdb.com/title/tt0494290/fullcredits/writers?ref_=m_tt_cl_wr

1966 births
Living people
Indian lyricists
Indian male poets